Arthur Acheson Williams (1848–?) was the second Bishop of Tinnevelly in the last decades of the 19th century and the first two of the 20th.

He was educated at Trinity College, Dublin and ordained in 1870. He was then held curacies at Bromley and St John the Evangelist, Penge. Emigrating to India  he became Chaplain of St George’s Cathedral, Madras and then the incumbent at Vellore. His last post before appointment to the episcopate was as Archdeacon of Madras.

References

1848 births
Alumni of Trinity College Dublin
Anglican archdeacons in India
20th-century Anglican bishops in India
Anglican bishops of Tinnevelly
1914 deaths